Sir Philip Wodehouse, 3rd Baronet (24 July 1608 – 6 May 1681) was an English politician who sat in the House of Commons at various times between 1654 and 1660.

Wodehouse was the son of Sir Thomas Wodehouse, 2nd Baronet, and Blanche, daughter of John Carey, 3rd Baron Hunsdon. In 1654, he was elected Member of Parliament for Norfolk in the First Protectorate Parliament. He was re-elected MP for Norfolk in 1656 for the Second Protectorate Parliament. He succeeded to the baronetcy on the death of his father on 18 March 1658. In 1660 he was elected MP for Thetford in the Convention Parliament.

Wodehouse married Lucy, daughter of Sir Thomas Cotton, 2nd Baronet. His son Thomas predeceased him. He died in May 1681, aged 72, and was succeeded in the baronetcy by his grandson, John. Lady Wodehouse died in June 1684.

Sir Philip Wodehouse is known to have engaged in correspondence with Sir Thomas Browne and employed John Jenkins (composer) as music-master at Kimberley.

References

1681 deaths
Baronets in the Baronetage of England
1608 births
Philip Wodehouse, 3rd Baronet
English MPs 1654–1655
English MPs 1656–1658
English MPs 1660
Members of the Parliament of England for Norfolk
Members of the Parliament of England for Thetford